Mort douce may refer to:

La Mort douce
Mort Douce Live